Francisco de Paula Coloma-Gallegos y Pérez (26 April 1912 – 28 September 1993) was a Spanish general who served as Minister of the Army of Spain between 1973 and 1975, during the Francoist dictatorship.

References

1912 births
1993 deaths
Defence ministers of Spain
Government ministers during the Francoist dictatorship